Nellu is a 1974 Malayalam-language drama film directed by Ramu Kariat from a screenplay by K. G. George based on the 1972 award-winning novel of the same name by P. Valsala. It features an ensemble cast of Prem Nazir, Jayabharathi, Thikkurissy Sukumaran Nair, Sankaradi and Kottarakkara Sreedharan Nair. The film portrays the life of the Adiyar community, a tribe of the forests in the Wayanad hills of Kerala, through the eyes of an outsider.

In 1972, Kariat approached Valsala for permission to adapt the novel, and when she agreed, he asked K. G. George, S. L. Sadanandan and Valsala to write separate scripts based on the novel and in the end, took certain portions from all the three and made the film. Principal photography commenced in 1972 with filming taking place in various villages near Thirunelli in Wayanad. The film has music composed by Salil Chowdhury, cinematography by Balu Mahendra and editing by Hrishikesh Mukherjee and Appu.

Nellu was released theatrically on 23 August 1974; it received critical acclaim, primarily for the script and making, and was a box office success, running for more than 100 days in theatres. The film marks the debut of cinematographer Balu Mahendra although not his first release. He won the Kerala State Film Award for Best Photography (Colour). Hrishikesh Mukherjee and Appu won the award for Kerala State Film Award for Best Editing. The film also won the 1974 Filmfare Award for Best Film - Malayalam.

Plot 
On his pilgrimage to Thirunelli temple and to immerse the ashes of his mother in the sacred river Papanashini that flows beside the temple, Raghavan Nair befriends the family of Savithri Warasyar, a widow. He stays with the family at her request. Nair comes across the life of the tribals. Their struggle against Nature, superstitions, the servility and exploitation they put up with, all of this become notes in his diary. The story is narrated through Nair’s observations. 

Kurumatti , is a tattooist of the tribal community and is married to Chathan. She tries to seduce Mallan, a handsome tribal youth. Chundeli who was away from Thirunelli for a long time returns to the village with his wife Pembi and daughter Mara. Mallan and Mara fall in love with each other. Chundeli and Pembi agree to their marriage. Kurumatti is upset by this. She spreads rumors that Mara and Mallan belong to same gothra or clan and so, according to the tribal traditions, cannot marry.

The tribal chief, imposes a ban on their marriage. Mara runs away with Mallan. The tribal community turns against them and the chief imposes a penalty for their breaking the traditions. Mallan leaves Thirunelli in order to earn money to pay the penalty. Mara stays in a storeroom at Savithri’s house.

Savithri’s younger brother Unnikrishnan is drawn towards the charming Mara. On a rainy day he rapes Mara and leaves the village. Mallan is afflicted by malaria but reaches the village with the money. He dies of the disease. The tribal chief sentences Mara to be lapidated and driven away from the tribal colony. Raghavan Nair intervenes and promises to keep Mara away from the colony. He requests Savithri help Mara and she accepts the tribal woman as her daughter. The film ends with Raghavan Nair leaving Thirunelli.

Cast

Production 
P. Valsala wrote the novel after a rejuvenating experience in Wayanad. It was published in 1972 by Sahithya Pravarthaka Cooperative Society. It went on to become a best-seller and won the Kumkumam Award for Best Novel in 1973. Kariat approached Valsala for permission to adapt the novel, and when she agreed, he asked K. G. George, S. L. Puram Sadanandan and Valsala to write separate scripts based on the novel and in the end, took certain portions from all the three and made the film.

Noted South Indian actress Sharada was originally chosen for the role of Mara. She turned down the offer when Kariat insisted that she dress like the tribal women of Wayanad. Later, Kariat fixed Jayabharathi, another leading actress of the time, for that role. Nellu marked the debut of actor Mohan Sharma who went on to act in about 100 films in Malayalam. Ramu Kariat was impressed by A View from the Fort, Balu Mahendra's diploma film at the FTII and cast him as the cinematographer of the film.

The film's production occurred at various villages near Thirunelli in Wayanad.  It was produced by N. P. Ali under the banner of Jammu Films International.

Soundtrack 

The song " Kadali Chenkadali" was sung by Lata Mangeshkar and is her only song in Malayalam.

Awards 
Filmfare Award for Best Film – Malayalam won by N.P. Ali (1974)

References

External links 
 
 Nellu at Malayalam Movie Database

Further reading 
 
 

1970s Malayalam-language films
1974 films
1974 romantic drama films
Films based on Indian novels
Films directed by Ramu Kariat
Films scored by Salil Chowdhury
Indian romantic drama films
Indigenous films